The 2022 Deutsche Tourenwagen Masters was the thirty-sixth season of the premier German touring car championship and also the twenty-third season under the moniker of Deutsche Tourenwagen Masters since the series' resumption in 2000. It was the second season of the DTM to be run under Group GT3 regulations.

Teams and drivers
All teams competed with tyres supplied by Michelin.

Team changes
 GT World Challenge Europe regulars Attempto Racing joined the DTM full-time, running a single Audi R8 LMS Evo II car.
 Rowe Racing, which ran two BMW M6 GT3 cars full-time in 2021, left the DTM in order to concentrate on endurance racing.
 Schubert Motorsport joined the series full-time by fielding two BMW M4 GT3 cars. Walkenhorst Motorsport also fielded two BMW M4 GT3 cars full-time in 2022, after racing with a single BMW M6 GT3 car in 2021.
 GRT Grasser Racing Team joined the series full-time by fielding a total of four Lamborghini Huracán GT3 Evo cars. The Austrian team is factory-backed by Lamborghini.
 T3 Motorsport were initially set not to be factory-backed by Lamborghini, after racing two Huracán GT3 Evo cars full-time in 2021, but the decision was reversed shortly before the start of the season. The team confirmed the retainment of their 2021 driver Esmee Hawkey and the signing of Nicki Thiim.
 JP Motorsport did not return to the series in 2022, after making guest appearances at three rounds in 2021 by fielding a single McLaren 720S GT3 car.
 Mercedes-AMG Team GetSpeed left the series after running a single-car effort for Arjun Maini in 2021.
 Timo Bernhard's KÜS Team Bernhard team joined the DTM full-time, entering a single Porsche 911 GT3 R car.
 SSR Performance joined the series full-time by fielding two Porsche 911 GT3 R cars, after making a guest appearance with a single car at the Nürburgring round in 2021.

Driver changes
 Three-time DTM champion René Rast returned to the series with Abt Sportsline and replaced Mike Rockenfeller, who retired from the series at the end of the 2021 season. Ricardo Feller, who won the 2021 ADAC GT Masters, joined the DTM for the first time, replacing Sophia Flörsch in the third Abt Sportsline car.
 German teen racer Marius Zug made his DTM debut for new team Attempto Racing.
 Esteban Muth left Lamborghini for BMW and T3 Motorsport for Walkenhorst Motorsport to become the team's second driver alongside Marco Wittmann.
 Philipp Eng returned to the DTM after a one-year absence and joined Schubert Motorsport to partner Sheldon van der Linde, who drove for Rowe Racing in 2021. Timo Glock, the other Rowe Racing driver in 2021, did not return to the DTM full-time in 2022.
 Mirko Bortolotti joined the series full-time for the GRT Grasser Racing Team, after making a guest appearance for T3 Motorsport at the Assen round in 2021 and finishing second in the first race. He is partnered by ADAC GT Masters racer Clemens Schmid, Formula 2 driver Alessio Deledda and Swiss gentleman driver Rolf Ineichen, all three making their DTM debuts.
 Aston Martin factory driver Nicki Thiim made his DTM debut, driving a Lamborghini Huracán GT3 Evo for T3 Motorsport.
 Liam Lawson and Alex Albon, who drove for the Red Bull-backed AF Corse team in 2021, did not return to the series in 2022, as Lawson switched his focus to Formula 2 and Albon returned to Formula One with Williams Racing. They were replaced by Felipe Fraga, who made his DTM debut, and Nick Cassidy, who already stood in for Albon at the 2021 season finale.
 Defending champion Maximilian Götz left Team HRT to replace Philip Ellis at Team Winward, both teams running a Mercedes-AMG. Team HRT replaced Götz with Luca Stolz, who joined the DTM full-time after making a guest appearance at the Nürburgring round in 2021. Arjun Maini also moved between Mercedes-AMG teams, as he left Team GetSpeed for Team HRT to replace Vincent Abril.
 Maro Engel returned to the DTM for the first time since 2017 to drive a Mercedes-AMG for Team GruppeM Racing alongside Mikaël Grenier, who joined the series for the first time to replace Daniel Juncadella.
 Former FIA Formula 3 driver David Schumacher joined the series for the first time to drive a third car for Mercedes-AMG Team Winward, partnering Götz and Lucas Auer.
 Thomas Preining joined the series for the first time, driving KÜS Team Bernhard's sole Porsche 911 GT3 R car.
 Laurens Vanthoor and Dennis Olsen joined the series for the first time, driving the two Porsche 911 GT3 R cars fielded by SSR Performance.

Rule changes

Sporting 
 One championship point will be awarded for the fastest race lap.
 Team orders were completely outlawed in the wake of the 2021 season finale controversy at the Norisring. Teams and drivers who influence the race via team orders might be excluded from the championship.
 Introduction of "full-course yellow" (FCY) to replace safety car interventions when appropriate. Restarts will be done two-abreast, similar to the series' race and safety car restarts.
 The mandatory pit stop can now be made while the safety car is deployed.
 The race start procedure has been revised: the race gets underway with a starting light at the hands of the race director. Previously, the pole-sitter could decide when to go full-throttle. The starting formation can now be left as soon as the starting light releases the field.
 Pit stop procedures have been modified: a maximum of two mechanics on each side of the car have to change the rear wheels first before the change at the front axle can begin. Mandatory pit stops can not be served prior to minute 10 or after minute 40 of the race.

Technical 
 Balance of performance (BoP) can now be changed at any time throughout the season up until the last race.

Race calendar
A nine-round 2022 calendar was announced on 3 September 2021. On 23 December 2021, it was announced that an unconfirmed round outside Germany on 4 and 5 June 2022 would not take place, making it an eight-round calendar.

Calendar changes
 Spa-Francorchamps returns to the DTM calendar after a one-year hiatus while Portimão and Imola will make their DTM débuts. On the opposite side, the rounds at Zolder, Assen and Monza were ousted from the calendar.
 The Norisring round will return to its traditional spot in early July, after the circuit hosted the season finale for the first time in 2021. On the other hand, the Hockenheimring round will retain its traditional spot in early October and return to being the final round of the season.

Results and standings

Season summary

Scoring system 
Points were awarded to the top ten classified finishers as follows:

Additionally, the top three placed drivers in qualifying also received points:

Drivers' championship

Teams' championship

Manufacturers' championship 
Only points scored by the top three drivers of a manufacturer in qualifying sessions and races count for the manufacturers' championship.

Notes

References

External links
  

Deutsche Tourenwagen Masters seasons
Deutsche Tourenwagen Masters
Deutsche Tourenwagen Masters